The Young Tradition were an English folk group of the 1960s, formed by Peter Bellamy, Royston Wood and Heather Wood. They recorded three albums of mainly traditional British folk music, sung in arrangements for their three unaccompanied voices.

Biography
The Young Tradition was formed on 18 April 1965 by Peter Bellamy (8 September 1944, Bournemouth, Dorset – 19 September 1991), Royston Wood (1935 – 8 April 1990) and Heather Wood (born Arielle Heather Wood, 31 March 1945, Attercliffe, Sheffield, Yorkshire, England) (who was unrelated to Royston Wood). Most of their repertoire was traditional British folk music, sung without instrumental accompaniment, and was drawn especially from the music of the Copper Family from Sussex, who had a strong oral musical tradition. They augmented the pure folk music with some composed songs which were strongly rooted in the English folk tradition, such as sea shanties written by Cyril Tawney, of which "Chicken on a Raft" was the most notable.

In the late 1960s, London became the centre of the English folk music revival and The Young Tradition moved there, sharing a house with John Renbourn, Bert Jansch and Anne Briggs.

They recorded three albums as well as an EP on the Transatlantic Records label. Allegedly, the group also had an uncredited cameo appearance singing the Marat, We're Poor chorus on Judy Collins' 1966 In My Life album. They also collaborated with Shirley Collins on an album recorded in 1969 called The Holly Bears the Crown. A single of The Boar's Head Carol was released from these sessions in 1974 (by Argo Records), but owing in part to the band's 1969 break up, the full album was not released until 1995 (by Fledg'ling Records). Transatlantic also released a compilation record in 1969: The Young Tradition Sampler.

Their later work became more influenced by mediaeval music.  "Galleries", their last album released during the life of the band, was musically augmented by Dolly Collins, Dave Swarbrick, David Munrow and The Early Music Consort. It included a version of "Agincourt Carol".

In 1969, the group split up on account of their different musical preferences, with Bellamy wanting to pursue pure traditional music. Their final concert was at Cecil Sharp House, home of the English Folk Dance and Song Society, in October 1969.

Royston and Heather Wood continued to work together after the split with Peter Bellamy in 1969, but they did not record again until 1977 when they released No Relation, an album which included Peter Bellamy as guest singer on three tracks and also appearances by guitarists Pete Kirtley and Simon Nicol and bass guitarist Ashley Hutchings.

Royston Wood sang briefly with Swan Arcade and died after a car accident in 1990, and Peter Bellamy died by suicide in 1991. Heather Wood has lived in New York City since 1977.

Discography
 The Young Tradition - 1965
 So Cheerfully Round - 1966
 Chicken on a Raft - 1968 (EP)
 Galleries - 1969
 The Young Tradition Sampler - 1969
 Galleries Revisited - 1973 (Reissue of Galleries with additional sleeve notes by Heather Wood)
 The Holly Bears the Crown - recorded 1969, released 1995  
 Royston Wood & Heather Wood - No Relation - 1977
 Galleries/No Relation - 1997 (Reissue of Galleries and the EP with additional tracks by Royston & Heather Wood on a single CD)
 The Young Tradition/So Cheerfully Round- 1999 (Reissue of first 2 albums on a single CD)
 Oberlin 1968 - 2013 release of a live performance at Oberlin College, Oberlin, Ohio, United States, on 17 November 1968. Fledg'ling FLED3094

References

Bibliography
 Bob Copper, A Song for Every Season: 100 Years in the Life of a Sussex Farming Family, Heinemann, 1971.

External links
 Peter Bellamy tribute site (no longer active - Internet Archive link)
 Peter Bellamy information
 Heather Wood's home page
 The Copper Family website

English folk musical groups